Lee Lawson (October 14, 1941 – May 22, 2022) was an American stage, soap opera and television actress, best-known as Bea Reardon in Guiding Light (1981–1990) and as Barbara Sterling in Love of Life (1965). She also appeared on episodes of Maude and Kojak. Her last screen appearance came in an episode of the 1991 television series Reasonable Doubts. Lawson had six Broadway credits.

Lawson was born in New York City. She died in New York City on May 22, 2022, at age 80, of cancer and COVID-19. She was predeceased by her husband, Joseph Bova, and was survived by her three children (Leslie, Chris, and Gaby) and three grandchildren.

References

External links

1941 births
2022 deaths
American stage actresses
American soap opera actresses
American television actresses
Actresses from New York City
20th-century American actresses
Deaths from cancer
Deaths from the COVID-19 pandemic in New York (state)